Jet Express is a high-speed ferry service departing from mainland ports in Port Clinton and Sandusky, Ohio. It offers service between Port Clinton, Sandusky, Put-In-Bay, Kelleys Island, and Cedar Point. It is one of the fastest ferries on Lake Erie, taking as little as 25 minutes to travel the 12 miles between Port Clinton and Put-in-Bay.{1}

History 

Put-in-Bay Boat Line Co. “The Jet Express,” was established in 1988 and began its first season of operating in the spring of 1989, by four partners (Duggan's, McCann's, Stoiber's, Booker's). Today, the majority owner and President is Todd Blumensaadt.

The company began with a new 3 million water-jet powered catamaran, the Jet Express, and soon added the 3.2 million Jet Express II in 1992. A partnership with the Put-in-Bay Port Authority aided in the addition of the 2 million Jet Express III in 2002, and in 2009, a partnership with the Lorain Port Authority, brought in the 1.9 million Jet Express IV to the fleet. All four Jet Express vessels were built by the Gladdin-Hearn Shipbuilding Company in Somerset, Massachusetts.
Jet Express service has expanded from the original Port Clinton to Put-in-Bay route, to include the mainland ports of Sandusky (2005), and Lorain (2009) (( Typically Excursions out of this port)). With regular service to Kelley's Island (2006), Put-in-Bay, and Cedar Point (2016). Additionally, Jet Express offers Excursion Adventure Cruises. These cruises are theme based and visit a variety of US and Canadian ports, throughout Lake Erie and its tributaries.

Fleet 
The Jet Express fleet comprises four catamaran vessels:
Jet Express (1989)
Jet Express II (1992) 
Jet Express III (2002) 
Jet Express IV (2009)

References 

Tourism in Ohio
Transportation in Ottawa County, Ohio
Ferries of Ohio